The Prague groschen was a groschen-type silver coin that was issued by Wenceslaus II of Bohemia since 1300 in the Kingdom of Bohemia and became very common throughout Medieval Central Europe.

Coin
It is a silver coin with on the obverse the legend DEI GRATIA REX BOEMIE ("By the grace of God the King of Bohemia") and on the reverse GROSSI PRAGENSES ("Prague groschen"). The weight of the coin varies between 3.5 and 3.7 g with a fineness of 933/1000 of silver.

The groschen was subdivided into twelve parvus ("small") coins with a Bohemian heraldic lion sign on the obverse.

History

Minting of this coin started around 1300 after silver mines had been discovered in Kutná Hora during the reign of the Bohemian king Wenceslaus II. King Wenceslaus II invited the Italian lawyer Gozzius of Orvieto to create a mining code Ius regale montanorum which was also partly a reform of the coinage. This, and the high amount of silver found in Kutná Hora, resulted in the implementation of the Prague groschen. Because of the high amount of silver used in the coin, it became one of the most popular of the early Groschen-type coins in medieval Europe.

In documents of the era, like e.g. the Peace of Thorn (1411), large amounts of money often were given in more convenient unit, called in Latin sexagena (= threescore) of Prague groschen, which equals to Czech term kopa = 5 dozen = ½ small gross = 60.

After the opening of new silver mines in Jáchymov (Joachimsthal) the Thaler, in Bohemia known as tolar, came in use. In 1547, minting of Prague groschen was discontinued by king Ferdinand I.

See also 
 Meissen groschen, modelled on the Prague groschen.

Etymology
The inspiration came from France where groschen were used since 1266, and replaced old coins called denar. The name came from the Latin denarius grossus.

External links

 History of Pražský groš 
 Prager Groschen / sexagenas grossorum bohemicalium boni argenti 

1300 establishments in Europe
1547 disestablishments in Europe
Medieval currencies
History of Prague
Currencies of the Czech Republic
Currencies of Europe
Currencies of Poland
Groschen